Herman Francis "Stumpy" Rohrig (March 19, 1918 – July 14, 2002) was a former player in the National Football League. He was drafted by the Green Bay Packers in the sixth round of the 1941 NFL Draft and would play three seasons with the team. Following his retirement as a player, he worked as an official and a scout in the NFL and serve as an alternate field judge for Super Bowl I. He also was a supervisor of officials for the Big Ten Conference, mentoring future NFL referee Jerry Markbreit and numerous others who reached the professional ranks. 

A graduate of Lincoln High School in Lincoln, Nebraska, he is an inductee in the Nebraska Sports Hall of Fame.

References

People from Mason City, Iowa
Green Bay Packers players
Nebraska Cornhuskers football players
1918 births
2002 deaths